The assessment of basic language and learning skills (ABLLS, often pronounced "ables") is an educational tool used frequently with applied behavior analysis (ABA) to measure the basic linguistic and functional skills of an individual with developmental delays or disabilities.

Development
The revised assessment of basic language and learning skills (ABLLS-R) is an assessment tool, curriculum guide, and skills-tracking system used to help guide the instruction of language and critical learner skills for children with autism or other developmental disabilities.  It provides a comprehensive review of 544 skills from 25 skill areas including language, social interaction, self-help, academic and motor skills that most typically developing children acquire prior to entering kindergarten.  Expressive language skills are assessed based upon the behavioral analysis of language as presented by B.F. Skinner in his book, Verbal Behavior (1957).  The task items within each skill area are arranged from simpler to more complex tasks.  This practical tool facilitates the identification of skills needed by the child to effectively communicate and learn from everyday experiences.  The information obtained from this assessment allows parents and professionals to pinpoint obstacles that have been preventing a child from acquiring new skills and to develop a comprehensive language-based curriculum.
  
The ABLLS-R comprises two documents.  The ABLLS-R Protocol is used to score the child's performance on the task items and provides 15 appendices that allow for the tracking of a variety of specific skills that are included in the assessment.  The ABLLS-R Guide provides information about the features of the ABLLS-R, how to correctly score items, and how to develop Individualized Education Program (IEP) goals and objectives that clearly define and target the learning needs of a student.  

The original version was first released in 1998 by Behavior Analysts, Inc. and was developed by James W. Partington, Ph.D., BCBA-D and Mark L. Sundberg, Ph.D, BCBA-D.  It was revised in 2006 by  Partington.  The revised version incorporates many new task items and provides a more specific sequence in the developmental order of items within the various skill areas.  Significant changes were made in the revised version of the vocal imitation section with input from Denise Senick-Pirri, SLP-CCC.  Additional improvements were made to incorporate items associated with social interaction skills, motor imitation and other joint attention skills, and to ensure the fluent use of established skills.

Another assessment tool for learning is the International Development and Early Learning Assessment. This tool is used to measure and compare a child's, usually between the ages of three to six years, behavioral development and learning capabilities in other countries. Countries that used IDELA included Afghanistan, Bolivia, Ethiopia, Uganda, and Vietnam. The IDELA is based on a child's emergent literacy, emergent numeracy, Social-emotional skills, and motor skills.

WebABLLS and normative data

The WebABLLS is an electronic version of the assessment.  It allows parents, teachers, speech pathologists, behavior analysts, and others who design, coordinate, or supervise language or skill-acquisition programs to expedite the development of IEPs, progress reports, and to easily share information about a child.  The WebABLLS provides videos of many skills that are measured by the ABLLS-R and can be used to demonstrate those specific skills.

Over the past four years, parents, relatives and friends of typically developing children have been participating in an ongoing research project by entering data into the WebABLLS.  The data are collected by parents or professionals who both know the children and have received training in the administration of the ABLLS-R.  The data are updated at three-month intervals (i.e., 6 months, 9 months, 12 months) in order to track the specific changes in skills over the course of the children's development.  These preliminary data have been collected in a systematic manner to provide information about when each skill measured by the ABLLS-R is usually acquired by typically developing children.  

The preliminary data from this research project are from 81 children (42 females & 39 males) ranging in age from 6 months to 60 months.  Children are from a variety of geographical locations (both nationally and internationally) and of differing ethnic, socio-economic and educational backgrounds.  The average percent of the total possible scores along with the range from the highest to the lowest scores for the sample at each 3-month age intervals are presented.  The data clearly indicate that typically developing children demonstrate most of the basic language and learning skills measured by the ABLLS-R by the time they are 4 to 5 years of age.

Usage
While the ABLLS-R is most commonly used on children with developmental disabilities and delays (including autism), it can be used for anyone who may be lacking in basic communication or life skills.

It assesses the strengths and weaknesses of an individual in each of the 25 skill sets. Each skill set is broken down into multiple skills, ordered by typical development or complexity. So, a skill of F1 (Requests by indicating) is a simpler skill than F12 (Requesting Help). Usually, lower level skills are needed before proceeding to teach higher skills. However, many individuals display splinter skills that are above their practical level.

The ABLLS-R is conducted via observation of the child's behavior in each skill area. The instructor will provide a stimulus to the child (verbal, hand-over-hand, non-verbal, etc.), and, depending on what the child does (the behavior), determines their skill-level. Some skills are difficult or time-consuming to test; instructors frequently accept anecdotal evidence from parents and other instructors as to a child's ability at a given skill-level.

Sections
The ABLLS-R is split into 25 functional areas, each corresponding to a letter in the alphabet. The sections between the ABLLS and ABLLS-R are similar; it is mostly the skills that vary in number and scope.

Advantages and disadvantages
The following is a very brief list of advantages and disadvantages to using the ABLLS-R assessment.

Advantages
 Can be conducted by most people with a minimal understanding of applied behavior analysis.
 Addresses basic language, academic, self-help, classroom, and gross and fine motor skill sets.
 Provides quick review for parents and educators to identify skill level of student
 Easy for parents and teachers to communicate about the student's educational programming
 Provides data to indicate the skill level of normal development

Disadvantages
 Skill lists are not exhaustive (544 skills).
 Skills are mostly in order of childhood development, but every child learns differently.
 Not a fully standardized assessment
IDELA is too generalized making biased comparisons among international countries.

See also
 Applied behavior analysis
 Autism therapies
 Educational psychology
 Verbal Behavior (book)
 The Analysis of Verbal Behavior (journal)

References

Further reading
 Aman, M. G., Novotny, S., Samango-Sprouse, C., Lecavalier, L., Leonard, E., Gadow, K. D., King, B. H., Pearson, D. A., Gernsbacher, M. A. & Chez, M.  (2004).  Outcome Measures for Clinical Drug Trials in Autism.  CNS Spectrums, 9 (1), 36–47. 
 National Research Council (2002).  Educating Children with Autism.  Committee on Educational Interventions for Children with Autism.  Catherine Lord and  James P. McGee, eds.  Division of Behavioral and Social Sciences and Education.  Washington, DC:  National Academy Press.
 Neisworth, J. T. & Wolfe, P. S.  (2005).  The Autism Encyclopedia.  Baltimore, MD: Paul H. Brookes Publishing Co. 
 Sallows, G & Graupner, T. (2005).  Intensive Behavioral Treatment for Children With Autism: Four-Year Outcome and Predictors.  American Journal on Mental Retardation, 110(6), 417-438 
 Schwartz, I. S., Boulware, G., McBride, B. J. & Sandall, S. R.  (2001).  Functional Assessment Strategies for Young Children with Autism.  Focus on Autism and Other Developmental Disabilities, 16 (4), 222–227.
 Thompson, Travis.  (2011).  Individualized Autism Interventions for Young Children.  Baltimore, MD: Paul H. Brookes Publishing Co.
 Thompson, Travis.  (2007).  Making Sense of Autism.  Baltimore, MD: Paul H. Brookes Publishing Co.

External links
 Cambridge Center for Behavioral Studies - an organization that provides research-based information regarding effective treatment for individuals with a diagnosis of autism spectrum disorders
 Association for Science in Autism Treatment - an organization that provides research-based information regarding effective treatment for individuals with a diagnosis of autism spectrum disorders
 Behavior Analysts, Inc. – the company that designed and publishes the ABLLS-R
 WebABLLS.com - web based implementation of ABLLS-R

Child development
Educational psychology
Behaviorism